Daniel Ivernel (3 June 1920 – 11 November 1999) was a French film actor. He appeared in 50 films between 1947 and 1981.

Filmography

References

External links

1920 births
1999 deaths
French male film actors
People from Versailles
Burials at Père Lachaise Cemetery
20th-century French male actors
1999 suicides
Suicides in France